The Villa Romana Prize, is an art prize awarded by the Deutscher Künstlerbund. It was established in 1905 and is the oldest German art award. The prize consists of a one-year artistic residence in the Villa Romana, a nineteenth-century villa on the Via Senese in the southern outskirts of Florence, in Tuscany in central Italy.

Max Klinger, who in 1903 had become vice-president of the Deutscher Künstlerbund, established the Villa Romana as a study centre for artists in 1905. He had bought it that year for 60,000 gold lire. The prize was first awarded in that year also.

Among the many recipients of the award are Max Beckmann (1906), Ernst Barlach (1909), Joseph Fassbender (1929), Gerhard Marcks,  (1937), Walter Stöhrer (1978), and Georg Baselitz (1965).

Recipients

1905 to 1914 

 1905: Ulrich Hübner, Georg Kolbe, Max Kurzweil
 1906: Max Beckmann, Dora Hitz, Käthe Kollwitz, 
 1907: Martin Brandenburg, Georg Burmester, Fritz Mackensen
 1908: Ernst Barlach, 
 1909: Paul Baum, Willi Geiger, Adolf Schinnerer
 1910: Karl Albiker, Otto Höger, 
 1911: Ludwig Cauer, Otto Höger, 
 1912: Theo von Brockhusen, Alexander Gerbig, 
 1913: Karl Caspar, 
 1914: Otto Richard Bossert,

1928 to 1943 

 1928: Gerhard Marcks
 1929: Joseph Fassbender
 1930: Josef Henselmann
 1931: 
 1932: 
 1933: John Sass
 1934: 
 1935: , William Maly
 1936: Emy Roeder, Arthur Degner
 1937: Toni Stadler
 1938: Helmut Ruhmer
 1939: Fritz Bernuth
 1940: Rudolf Riester
 1941: Hans Breker, Karl Clobes, Walter Rossler
 1942: Oscar Kreibich, Hubert Nikolaus Lang, Karl Paul, Egon Schiffers
 1943: Wilhelm Hausmann, Kurt Lambert, Walter Wichmann

From 1959 
 1959: Theo Bechteler, Peter Herkenrath, Carl-Heinz Kliemann, Toni Stadler
 1960: John Geccelli, Jochen Hiltmann, Guido Jendritzko, Harry Koegler
 1961: Peter Brüning, Erwin Eichbaum, Wilhelm Hausmann, Wolfgang vom Schemm
 1962: Horst Antes, Gerson Fehrenbach, Paran G'schrey, Hans Kock
 1963: Friedrich Karl Gotsch, Günter Ferdinand Ris, Ursula Sax, Horst Skodlerrak
 1964: Clemens Fischer, Winfred Gaul, Utz Kampmann, Rolf Szymanski
 1965: Georg Baselitz, Franz Bucher, Rainer Küchenmeister, Ludwig Meidner
 1966: Hans Baschang, Dietlinde Stengelin, Helmut Sundhaußen, Gota Tellesch
 1967: Bernd Berner, Buja Bingemer, Horst Lark, Michael Black
 1968: Franz Bernhard, Rolf-Gunter Dienst, Hildegart Lutze, Gatja Helgart Rothe
 1969: Henry Brummack, Bernd Damke, Wolf Kahlen, Joachim Schmettau
 1970: Markus Lüpertz, Ansgar Nierhoff, Michael Schoenholtz, Ben Willikens
 1971: Peter Ackermann, Hermann Albert, Christa Dichgans, Jürgen Paatz
 1972: Klaus Fußmann, Edgar Gutbub, Max G. Kaminski, Hansjerg Maier-Aichen
 1973: Hede Bühl, Nino Malfatti, Jobst Meyer, Hans Peter Reuter
 1974: Kurt Koch, Christiane Maether, Heinz-Günter Prager, Arthur Stoll
 1975: Claudia Kinast, Bernd Klötzer, Alf Schuler, Dorothee von Windheim
 1976: Michael Bette, Michael Buthe, Nikolaus Lang, Bertram Weigel
 1977: Jakob Mattner, Anna Oppermann, Heinz Schanz, Gottfried Wiegand
 1978: Abraham David Christian, Elena Engel, Christiane Mobius, Walter Stöhrer
 1979: Johannes Brus, Friedemann Hahn, Inge Higher, Mechtild Nemeczek
 1980: Fritz Gilow, Rainer Mang, Reinhard Pods, Gerd Rohling
 1981: Frank Dornseif, Bruno Erdmann, Dieter Kraemer, Guenter Tužina
 1982: Gundi Bindernagel, Karl Bohrmann, Marina Makowski, Eva-Maria Schön
 1983: Martin Rosz, Norbert Tadeusz, Nicole van den Plas, Michael Witlatschil
 1984: Rolf Behm, Doris Hadersdorfer, George Meissner, Marianne Pohl
 1985: Cordula Giidemann, Paul Herberg, Sabine Krasel, William Weiner
 1986: Andreas Bindl, Dietz Eilbacher, Andreas Grunert, Max Neumann
 1987: Lisa Hoever, Bernd Minnich, Thomas Virnich, Jochen Zellmann, Karl-Heinz Krause
 1988: Nikifor Brueckner, Gabriela Dauerer, Walter Kütz, Klaus Schmetz
 1989: Jörg Eberhard, Bernd Jünger, Gisela Kleinlein, Berthold Langnickel
 1990: Albert Borchardt, Galli (artist), Hermann Josef Mispelbaum, Norbert Radermacher
 1991: Vera Leutloff, Eberhard Wagner, Barbara Wille, Carl Emanuel Wolff
 1992: Sybille Berke, Katharina Grosse, Klaus Gärtner, Bernd Mechler
 1993: Andreas Bee, Jochem Hendricks, Marko Lehanka, Hans-Willi Notthoff
 1994: Herbert Barden, Karin Sander, Michel Sauer, Martin Steiner
 1995: Isa Dahl, Wolfgang Hambrecht, Andreas Sansoni, Jörg Spamer
 1996: Irene Blume, Christiane Dellbrügge and Ralf de Moll, Maik Löbbert, Dirk Löbbert, Michael Munding
 1997: Franz Baumgartner, Martin Schmidt, Walter Schreiner, Barbara von Wienskowski
 1998: Brunner/Ritz, Tobias Gerber, Peter Herrmann, Andreas Schön
 1999: Heiner Blumenthal, Andreas Bunte, Daniel Knorr, Gregor Schneider, Vincent Tavene
 2000: Thomas Eller, Michael Kutzner, Simon Vogel, Amelie von Wulffen
 2002: Simone Böhm, Dorothea Goldschmidt, Stephan Gripp, Dieter Viegen
 2002: Barbara Heim, Hannes Norberg, Daniela Trixl, Christina Zück
 2003: Sven-Ole Frahm, Gelke Gaycken, Norbert Kuepper, Markus Vater, Christian Frosch
 2004: Ralf Brück, Monika Kapfer, Christian Black, Jörg Wagner
 2005: Robert Klümpen, Alexander Laner, Ulla Irina Rossek, Constantin Wallhäuser
 2006: Andrea Hanak, Simon Dybbroe Møller, Anna Kerstin Otto, Stefan Thater
 2007: Andrea Faciu, Barbara Kussinger, Silke Markefka, Mikhail Pirgelis
 2008: Dani Gal, Julia Schmidt, Asli Sungu, Clemens von Wedemeyer
 2009: Olivier Foulon, Kalin Lindena, Eske Schluter, Benjamin Yavuzsoy
 2010: Anna Heidenhain, Sebastian Dacey, Anna Möller, Martin Pfeifle
 2011: Nora Schultz, Rebecca Ann Tess, Vincent Vulsma, Thomas Kilpper, Henrik Olesen
 2012: Nine Budde, Wolfgang Breuer, Sophie Reinhold, Yorgos Sapountzis
 2013: Shannon Bool, Heide Hinrichs, Daniel Maier-Reimer, Mariechen Danz
 2014: Ei Arakawa, Natalie Czech, Loretta Fahrenholz, Petrit Halilaj, Sergei Tcherepnin, Alvaro Urbano
 2015: Alisa Margolis, Johannes Paul Raether, Judith Raum, Anike Joyce Sadiq
 2016: Flaka Haliti, Stefan Vogel, Nico Joana Weber, Jonas Weichsel
 2017: Andrea Bellu, Matei Bellu, Carina Brandes, Kasia Fudakowski, Stefan Pente, Farkhondeh Shahroudi
 2018: Jeewi Lee, Christophe Ndabananiye, Lerato Shadi, Viron Erol Vert
 2019: KAYA, Marcela Moraga, Christian Naujoks, Rajkamal Kahlon
 2020: Özlem Altin, Lydia Hamann and Kaj Osteroth, Alice Peragine, Amelia Umuhire
 2021: Pauline Curnier Jardin, Lene Markusen, Musa Michelle Mattiuzzi, Giuseppe Stampone
 2022: Haure Madjid, Jasmina Metwaly, Neda Saeedi, Alexander Skorobogatov

See also

 List of European art awards

References

External links

Awards established in 1905
German art awards
1905 establishments in Germany